Bonnee Buttered Beef Steaks were the flagship product of the Bonnee Frozen Products Company, which also produced frozen tamales and cubed steaks. Bonnee Buttered Beef Steaks consisted of "finely chopped beef, molded, frozen, sliced and buttered." They were sold in packages which each contained four frozen 2-ounce (conversion required) beef patties and four frozen pats of 94-score butter.

History
Bonnee Buttered Beef Steaks cost 58 cents a pound (conversion required) in 1956, which at that time was 10 cents a pound more than smoked ham. The beef steak patties were slim, so they could be cooked to perfection in about two minutes, using an iron skillet on a gas stove. Bonnee's were meat from the entire steer and once ground and blended they were meat reconstituted, under pressure, so they would not crumble like burgers but would need to be cut with a knife or torn like a thin steak. Bonnee Buttered Beef Steaks co-sponsored the St. Louis Hop television show (the St. Louis version of Philadelphia’s "American Bandstand"). The dance contest winners were provided with the products of the show's sponsors, Bonne Belle Cosmetics, Bonnee Buttered Beef Steaks, and Pepsi-Cola.

Bonnee Buttered Beef Steaks were originated by businessman Sam Brown (1913–1996), president of Bonnee Frozen Products Co., and produced from the mid-1940s to the early 1960s at the company plant at 8144 Olive Boulevard in University City, Missouri. Sam Brown had conceived the idea while working as a traveling salesman. He had observed that the food quality in small town restaurants was hit-or-miss and concluded that restaurant owners would welcome a meat course which had consistently-high quality and was nationally distributed. Starting with $125 of borrowed capital, within ten years Sam Brown had a multimillion dollar business, manufacturing and distributing Bonnee Buttered Beef Steaks to grocery stores, restaurants, and military commissaries in 38 states in the United States and in eight foreign countries.

The turning point for the success of Bonnee Buttered Beef Steaks may have been a repeat sales call that Sam Brown made to the owner of a combination drug store/restaurant. Even though the initial order of ten packages had sold out quickly, the customer refused to re-order, because he did not like them personally, and he didn't sell anything that he did not like personally. Looking around the store, Sam said "You sell castor oil in your store, don't you, mister? Mean to tell me you like it?" It was a sale Sam never forgot.

Sam Brown was born and raised in Kansas City, Missouri. He owned the Bonnee Frozen Products Co. for about twenty years. After he sold the business in the early 1960s, he worked as a consultant, retiring in the late 1970s. He was a founder and the first chairman of the St. Louis chapter of the Young President's Organization. His father, Isadore Brown, had emigrated to Kansas City from Russia and built a successful scrap steel business from an initial contract to remove old railroad track.

References

External links 
 http://tomshawcross.blogspot.com/2010/07/bonnee-buttered-beef-steaks.html

Steak
Brand name meats